Vilarinho do Bairro is a village and a civil parish of the municipality of Anadia, Portugal. The population in 2011 was 2,764, in an area of 25.56 km2.

References

Freguesias of Anadia, Portugal